The Hi-Desert Star is the first newspaper published and distributed in Yucca Valley, Morongo Valley, and Pioneertown, located within the southern Mojave Desert in San Bernardino County, California.

History
The newspaper was first published in April 1957 with backing from the Yucca Valley Chamber of Commerce, and initially called The Desert Star. However, the name was changed four months later after it was discovered that there was already a Desert Star newspaper that had been published in nearby Needles, California for the previous 40 years. Ironically, the paper was later sold to the owners of the Desert Star.

The paper started as a weekly, ending up published twice weekly, and is currently owned by Brehm Communications, along with 60 other publications in California, Nevada, Arizona, Utah, Iowa, Illinois and Indiana.

Other publications
The Hi-Desert Star also publishes:
The Desert Trail, Twentynine Palms
Desert Entertainer
Desert Mobile Home News

Hi-Desert Publishing's Mountain Division also publishes the Mountain News in Lake Arrowhead and the Big Bear Grizzly in Big Bear Lake.

References

External links

Newspapers published in California
Mass media in San Bernardino County, California
Yucca Valley, California
Publications established in 1957
1957 establishments in California